Robert or Bob Tucker may refer to:

 Robert C. Tucker (1918–2010), American political scientist and historian
 Robert W. Tucker (born 1924), American writer and teacher
 Robert Tucker (boat designer) (died 1998), British sailor and boat designer
 Robert Tucker (mathematician) (1832–1905), English mathematician
 Robert Tucker (horse trainer) (1857–1910), Kentucky Derby winning trainer
 Robert S. Tucker (born 1970), American businessman and philanthropist
 Robert Tucker (burgess 1753) (died 1767), member of the House of Burgesses, Virginia
 Arthur Wilson "Bob" Tucker (1914–2006), American theater technician and novelist
 Bob Tucker (American football) (born 1945), American football player
 Bob Tucker (coach) (1943–2017), American football player and coach